Chamaz Kola (also Romanized as Chamāz Kolā) is a village in Feyziyeh Rural District, in the Central District of Babol County, Mazandaran Province, Iran. At the 2006 census, its population was 858, in 210 families.

References 

Populated places in Babol County